William Lisle was a politician.

William Lisle may also refer to:

William Lisle (died 1442), MP for Oxfordshire (UK Parliament constituency)
William L'Isle, scholar of Anglo-Saxon
William Lisle (Royal Navy officer)

See also